Kerr is a census-designated place (CDP) in Lake County, Montana, United States. The population was 251 at the 2010 census, up from 17 in 2000.

Geography
Kerr is located in north-central Lake County at  (47.677998, -114.192717), bordering the southwest side of Polson, the county seat. The western edge of the Kerr CDP is formed by the Flathead River as it exits Flathead Lake.

Demographics

As of the census of 2000, there were 17 people, 6 households, and 6 families residing in the CDP. The population density was 69.9 people per square mile (27.3/km2). There were 9 housing units at an average density of 37.0/sq mi (14.5/km2). The racial makeup of the CDP was 82.35% White and 17.65% Native American. Hispanic or Latino of any race were 11.76% of the population.

There were 6 households, out of which 50.0% had children under the age of 18 living with them, 100.0% were married couples living together, and 0.0% were non-families. No households were made up of individuals, and none had someone living alone who was 65 years of age or older. The average household size was 2.83 and the average family size was 2.83.

In the CDP, the population was spread out, with 23.5% under the age of 18, 11.8% from 18 to 24, 23.5% from 25 to 44, 29.4% from 45 to 64, and 11.8% who were 65 years of age or older. The median age was 42 years. For every 100 females, there were 70.0 males. For every 100 females age 18 and over, there were 85.7 males.

References

Census-designated places in Montana
Census-designated places in Lake County, Montana